Moșna may refer to several places in Romania:

 Moșna, Iași, a commune in Iași County
 Moșna, Sibiu, a commune in Sibiu County
 Moșna (Prut), a tributary of the Prut in Iași County
 Moșna (Târnava Mare), a tributary of the Târnava Mare in Sibiu County

See also
 Mosna (disambiguation)
 Moșneni (disambiguation)
 Moșteni (disambiguation)